Paddy Bermingham may refer to:

 Paddy Bermingham (athlete) (1886–1959), Irish police officer and sportsman
 Paddy Bermingham (footballer) (1904–1970), Irish footballer

See also
 Patrick Bermingham ( 1460–1532), Irish judge and statesman